Yvonne Mitchell (born Yvonne Frances Joseph; 7 July 1915 – 24 March 1979) was an English actress and author. After beginning her acting career in theatre, Mitchell progressed to films in the late 1940s. Her roles include Julia in the 1954 BBC adaptation of George Orwell's novel Nineteen Eighty-Four. She retired from acting in 1977.

Early life
Mitchell was born Yvonne Frances Joseph, but in 1946 changed her name by deed poll to Yvonne Mitchell (without the Frances). Her parents were Madge (Mitchell) and Bertie Joseph. Her cousin was Conservative MP Keith Joseph. She was Jewish and was educated in Sussex at Battle Abbey School and St Paul's Girls' School in London.

Acting
Mitchell trained for an acting career at the London Theatre Studio,<ref>Charles Landstone, Off-stage: A Personal Record of the First Twelve Years of Stage Sponsored Drama in Great Britain (Arts Council of Great Britain, 1953), p. 154</ref> making her professional debut in 1939. Already an experienced stage actress, she made her speaking film debut in The Queen of Spades (1949), although she played an uncredited minor role in Love on the Dole eight years earlier.

She had several prominent film roles over the next three decades, winning a British Film Award for The Divided Heart (1954) and the Silver Bear for Best Actress at the 7th Berlin International Film Festival for Woman in a Dressing Gown (1957). She appeared as Mildred in the controversial film Sapphire (1959).

Mitchell was voted 'Television Actress of the Year' for 1953 by the Daily Mail newspaper, mainly for her role as Cathy in the Nigel Kneale/Rudolph Cartier adaptation of Emily Brontë's novel Wuthering Heights. The next year, she appeared in another Kneale/Cartier literary adaptation in the role of Julia, with Peter Cushing as Winston Smith, in their adaptation of Nineteen Eighty-Four.

She starred as Lea in the 1973 BBC TV production of Colette's Cheri. She continued to appear in television guest roles until the late 1970s, in series such as Out of the Unknown (in 1966); her final screen role was in the BBC science-fiction series 1990 (1977).

Writing
Outside acting, Mitchell was also an established author, writing several books for children and adults as well as winning awards for playwriting. Her plays include The Same Sky''. She wrote an acclaimed biography of the French writer Colette, and her own autobiography was published in 1957.

Personal life

Mitchell was married to the journalist, film and theatre critic and novelist Derek Monsey (1921–1979) and they lived in a village in the south of France.

Mitchell died of cancer, aged 63, in 1979. Monsey died the same year, roughly one month earlier. Their daughter Cordelia Monsey is a theatre director and a long-term associate of both Sir Peter Hall and Sir Trevor Nunn. Yvonne Mitchell's grandson is the drummer and violinist, Mitch McGugan.

Filmography

References

External links

1915 births
1979 deaths
People educated at St Paul's Girls' School
Alumni of the London Theatre Studio
Deaths from cancer in England
Best British Actress BAFTA Award winners
Jewish English actresses
English Jews
English film actresses
English stage actresses
English television actresses
Actresses from London
20th-century English actresses
Silver Bear for Best Actress winners